Benjamin Swearer (May 18, 1825 – November 2, 1902) was a United States Navy sailor and a recipient of the United States military's highest decoration—the Medal of Honor—for his actions in the American Civil War.

While serving as a Seaman aboard the steam sloop-of-war  on August 29, 1861, Swearer took part in the capture of Fort Clark at Hatteras Inlet, North Carolina. For his service during this action, known as the Battle of Hatteras Inlet Batteries, Swearer was awarded the Medal of Honor on April 3, 1863.

Medal of Honor citation

Rank and Organization: Seaman, U.S. Navy. Born: 1825, Baltimore, Md. Accredited to: Maryland. G.O. No.: 11, April 3, 1863.

Citation:

Embarked in a surfboat from the U.S.S. Pawnee during action against Fort Clark, off Baltimore Inlet, August 29, 1861. Taking part in a mission to land troops and to remain inshore and provide protection, Swearer rendered gallant service throughout the action and had the honor of being the first man to raise the flag on the captured fort.

See also

List of American Civil War Medal of Honor recipients: Q–S

References

 

1825 births
1902 deaths
United States Navy Medal of Honor recipients
Military personnel from Baltimore
Union Navy sailors
People of Maryland in the American Civil War
American Civil War recipients of the Medal of Honor